Rodrigue Kwizera (born 10 October 1999) is a Burundian long-distance runner.

Career
In 2017, Rodrigue Kwizera competed in the senior men's race at the IAAF World Cross Country Championships in Kampala, Uganda. He placed 39th.

He competed in the senior men's race at the 2019 IAAF World Cross Country Championships held in Aarhus, Denmark, and finished in 11th place. That year, he also represented Burundi at the 2019 African Games staged in Rabat, Morocco. He competed in the men's 5000 metres and placed 16th. Kwizera finished 16th in the men's 10,000 metres at the 2019 World Athletics Championships held in Doha.

He won the 2021–22 World Cross Country Tour. He placed 16th in the 10,000 m at the 2022 World Athletics Championships in Eugene, Oregon.

Achievements

Circuit wins and titles
 World Cross Country Tour: 2021–22
 2021–22 (5): Cross Internacional de Soria, Cross de San Sebastián, Cross Internacional de Itálica, Cross Internacional de Venta de Baños, Almond Blossom Cross Country
 2022–23 (4): Cross Internacional Zornotza, Cross Internacional de la Constitución, Cross Internacional de Venta de Baños, Campaccio

Personal bests
 5000 metres – 13:20.17 (Castellón 2022)
 10,000 metres – 27:25.47 (Maia 2022)
Road
 10 kilometres – 26:56 (Herzogenaurach 2022)

References

External links
 

Living people
1999 births
Place of birth missing (living people)
Burundian male long-distance runners
Burundian male cross country runners
World Athletics Championships athletes for Burundi
Athletes (track and field) at the 2019 African Games
African Games competitors for Burundi
21st-century Burundian people